Etta James Rocks the House is the first live album by the American singer Etta James. It was recorded live on the nights of September 27 and 28, 1963, at the New Era Club in Nashville, Tennessee, and was released on December 13, 1963.

Hot with the releases of At Last! and The Second Time Around, Etta James Rocks the House became the artist's first recorded live album under Argo Records. The concept was to catch James in a raw and fiery performance outside the recording studio. The album is among her finest live recordings.

Track listing
"Something's Got a Hold on Me" (Etta James, Leroy Kirkland, Pearl Woods) – 5:02
"Baby What You Want Me to Do" (Jimmy Reed) – 4:14
"What'd I Say" (Ray Charles) – 3:15
"Money (That's What I Want)" (Janie Bradford, Berry Gordy, Jr.) – 3:22
"Seven Day Fool" (Billy Davis, Berry Gordy, Jr., Sonny Woods) – 4:20
"Sweet Little Angel" (Robert McCollum) – 4:14
"Ooh Poo Pah Doo" (Jessie Hill) – 4:04
"Woke Up This Morning" (B.B. King) – 3:38
"Ain't That Loving You Baby" (Jimmy Reed) – 2:51*
"All I Could Do Was Cry" (Billy Davis, Gwen Fuqua, Berry Gordy, Jr.) – 3:21*
"I Just Want to Make Love to You" (Willie Dixon) – 3:40*

Tracks 9, 10 and 11 on CD only; not included in the original 1963 LP release.

Personnel
Etta James – vocals
David T. Walker – guitar
Marion Wright - bass
Freeman Brown - drums
Richard Waters - drums
Vonzell Cooper - organ
Gavrell Cooper - tenor saxophone

References

Etta James albums
1963 live albums
Argo Records live albums
Albums produced by Leonard Chess
Albums produced by Etta James